Cryptophlebia semilunana is a moth of the family Tortricidae. It is found in Africa, where it is known from Kenya, Uganda, Tanzania, South Africa, Madagascar, Réunion and Mauritius.

Host plants of the larvae of this species are Fabaceae (Sesbania sp.)

References

External links
Boldsystems.org: pictures of Cryptophlebia semilunana

Grapholitini
Moths of Madagascar
Lepidoptera of Uganda
Moths of Mauritius
Lepidoptera of Tanzania
Moths of Réunion
Moths of Sub-Saharan Africa
Moths described in 1880